Sara Grace Wallerstedt is an American fashion model. Her beauty has been described as "ethereal". As of March 2018, she is currently ranked in Models.com Top 50 Models list.

Early life
Sara Grace Wallerstedt was born in the Dallas suburb of Bedford, Texas to Darren and Karen Wallerstedt. She is an alumna of Trinity High School. She described herself as a "nerd" who didn't know what high fashion was, but she told The New York Times it was her way of getting out of Bedford, Texas.

Career
Wallerstedt was signed on sight at a Dallas-area modeling agency called Wallflower Management and debuted as a Proenza Schouler exclusive in 2016. She was also an exclusive for Calvin Klein. Her first magazine cover was Vogue Italia and her first campaign appearance was for Prada, considered two of the highest feats in modeling. She notably closed Prada's F/W 2017 fashion show. She has walked the runway for Fendi, Burberry, Chanel, Tory Burch, Dior, Michael Kors, Louis Vuitton, Tom Ford, Salvatore Ferragamo, Versace, Valentino, and Anna Sui among others. Vogue Paris states she was one of the most booked in the F/W 2018 season.

Wallerstedt has appeared in American Vogue, including an editorial about her hometown of Bedford. She has also appeared in W (magazine) and Harper's Bazaar. She was profiled in Vogue.

In addition to Vogue Italia, she has been on the cover of the May 2018 cover of Vogue Korea and Vogue China.

References 

1999 births
Living people
Female models from Texas
The Society Management models
Elite Model Management models
Prada exclusive models
21st-century American women